The Pokémon Graphic Novel, more commonly known as  is a Japanese manga series created by Toshihiro Ono and serialized in the children's manga magazine CoroCoro Comic. Individual chapters were collected into four tankōbon volumes by Shogakukan, who released the first volume on October 28, 1997 and the fourth volume on January 28, 2000. The characters and storylines are all drawn from the Pokémon anime series, although some events and depictions of characters diverge slightly from the anime, and the world itself has a visibly higher level of technology.

The manga was published in English in North America by Viz Communications in a "flipped", left-to-right format. In 1998 the company released the series as individual single comic book issues; the collected volumes came afterwards. At the time of its release Issue #1 was the best-selling manga issue, and best-selling comic book of any type, in the United States. The issue sold 1.001million copies, the highest for a single comic book since 1993. The first volume, The Electric Tale of Pikachu!, was released on September 5, 1999. The third volume, Electric Pikachu Boogaloo, was released on April 5, 2000.

In Singapore, the manga is published in English by Chuang Yi and translated as Pokémon: The Electric Tale of Pikachu! for all four volumes. The Traditional Chinese edition in Taiwan of the manga is published by Da Ran Culture Enterprise and Chingwin Publishing.

Development
Toshihiro Ono, the author of the series, said that he began drawing the series after Mr. Saito, Ono's editor, asked Ono to draw a manga to go along with the anime. During the production of the manga, Ono received scripts of the anime series. The author then altered the stories to fit the desired amount of pages used per storyline.

Ono said that his favorite manga chapter was "Clefairy Tale" from the first volume and that he was "embarrassed that I can't say why." According to Ono he did not find any particular chapter to be more difficult than any other chapter. He said that when the episode "Clefairy in Space" ("Subway no Pipi") was going in manga form, Ono had to redraw many of the pages, a time-consuming process. Ono encountered difficulty in drawing Dragonite in the final chapter, as he struggled to "get a face that cute to look powerful." His favorite human characters to work with were Ash Ketchum and Jessie and James. In particular he liked Jessie and James because they are minor characters and "have much more freedom" than main characters. Therefore, minor characters are "more fun to draw." Ono's favorite characters to draw were Ash Ketchum, Ditto, Nurse Joy, and Oddish.

Story

Jason S. Yadao, the author of The Rough Guide to Manga, wrote that "the story was predictable" and that "narrative complexity never was a defining trait of the franchise."

Characters
Japanese names in Western order (given name before family name) are given first, followed by the English name. For simplicity, English language names will be used in this and other articles in Wikipedia about Pokémon, unless explicitly referring to the Japanese version.

 Satoshi / Ash Ketchum - The main character, whose name in the Japanese version (Satoshi) is named after Satoshi Tajiri, the creator of the Pokémon games. Ash aspires to be a Pokémon Master, and together with the various friends and Pokémon that travel with him, embark on many adventures.  In a similar fashion to the game, Ash does this by entering various Pokémon League competitions.
 Kasumi / Misty - A Water-Type Pokémon trainer and the Gym Leader of Cerulean City. She is the youngest of four sisters. Like her anime counterpart, she joins Ash on his journey after he "borrows" her bike and Pikachu destroys it. Although critical towards Ash, she develops feelings towards him, who appears to reciprocate.
 Takeshi / Brock - A Rock-Type Pokémon breeder and the Gym Leader of Flint City. Unlike his anime counterpart, he never joins Ash on his journey and the only time they meet is during Ash's battle with him for his second badge.
 Pikachu, a little, yellow, mouse-like creature with a lightning bolt tail and the ability to create electrical jolts from its cheeks. Unlike the games or anime, Ash finds this Pikachu chewing on the electrical wiring in his house, and keeps it as his first Pokémon when he qualifies to be a trainer.
 Shigeru / Gary Oak - His name in the Japanese version (Shigeru) is named after famed video game designer Shigeru Miyamoto. Unlike his anime counterpart, this version of Ash's rival does not hang out with a pack of cheerleaders, nor does he travel by car. In fact, about the only thing this Gary has in common with the anime Gary is his antagonistic attitude towards Ash. In the manga's epilogue he travels with Ash.
 Team Rocket- A chaos causing 'gang' that has many goals, mainly conquering the Pokémon world.
 Musashi / Jessica "Jessie" - The female half of Team Rocket. In the manga's epilogue, she marries James and are expecting their first child.
 Kojiro / James - The male half of Team Rocket. In the epilogue, he quits the gang, marries Jessie, and are expecting their first child.
 Nyarth (ニャース Nyāsu) / Meowth - The talking cat of Team Rocket. One of very few Pokémon that can speak a human language.
 Sakaki / Giovanni - The seldom-seen boss/leader of Team Rocket.

Volume and comic list

The series was originally released in the United States in an American comic book format. Part 1, Issue #1 was released in November 1998, and the subsequent three issues of Part 1 were released in  December 1998, and January and February 1999. Part 2 #1 was released in March 1999 and the other three issues were released in April, May, and June of that year. Part 3 #1 was released in July 1999, and the other three issues were released in August, September, and October of that year. Part 4 #1 was released in November 1999 and the other issues were released in December 1999 and January and February 2000. In 1999 extremely low print samplers which were only available in the Pokémon Video Suitcase promotional set titled Pokémon Electric Tale of Pikachu Special Signature Edition was also released which contained the printed signature of Toshihiro Ono on the cover. The Special Signature Editions were available in a Red Version and a Blue Version.

Toshihiro Ono
Toshihiro Ono was born in Nagoya, Aichi Prefecture on February 27, 1965. He moved to Chiryū, Aichi Prefecture when he was one year old. Ono said that he began drawing in elementary school and junior high school. He drew illustrations for advertising agencies, men's magazine columns, and English language dictionaries. In addition to his freelance jobs he also was an assistant for Glass no Kamen, a manga by Suzue Miuchi. In August 1999, after the publication of Pokémon: The Electric Tale of Pikachu, Ono appeared at the San Diego Comic-Con. Ono said that he likes American comics because the artwork and storylines have "such a different flavor" than artwork and storylines of Japanese comics. His favorite artists were Walter Simonson and Mike Mignola.

References

Other Pokémon manga
Magical Pokémon Journey (known in Japan as PiPiPi's Adventures)
Pokémon Adventures (known in Japan as Pocket Monster Special)
Ash & Pikachu (known in Japan as Satoshi to Pikachu)
Pokémon Gold & Silver

External links

"Animerica Interview Toshihiro Ono" (Archive) VIZ Media.
EX.org vol 1. review
"Pokemon #1 Hits 1 Million Copies" (Archive) -(Viz Media) 
Mania vol. 3 review
Mania vol. 5 review

Children's manga
The Electric Tale Of Pikachu
Viz Media manga
1997 manga
Shogakukan manga